Elkhorn Grove can refer to:

Elkhorn Grove, Illinois
Elkhorn Grove Township, Carroll County, Illinois